The Plot Against Common Sense is the third studio album by Future of the Left.

Reception
Critical response to the album was positive, with a Metacritic score of 81/100 or "universal acclaim."

Track listing
"Sheena Is A T-Shirt Salesman" - 2:08
"Failed Olympic Bid" - 3:14
"Beneath The Waves An Ocean" - 3:47
"Cosmo's Ladder" - 2:34
"City Of Exploded Children" - 4:10
"Goals In Slow Motion" - 3:11
"Camp Cappuccino" - 2:48
"Polymers Are Forever" - 4:07
"Robocop 4 - Fuck Off Robocop" - 2:53
"Sorry Dad, I Was Late For The Riots" - 3:08
"I Am The Least Of Your Problems" - 2:33
"A Guide To Men" - 3:54
"Anchor" - 3:12
"Rubber Animals" - 1:54
"Notes On Achieving Orbit" - 6:22 (including hidden track)
Running time: 49:55

References

2012 albums
Future of the Left albums
Xtra Mile Recordings albums